The First Hughes ministry (Labor) was the 11th ministry of the Government of Australia. It was led by the country's 7th Prime Minister, Billy Hughes. The First Hughes ministry succeeded the Third Fisher ministry, which dissolved on 27 October 1915 following Andrew Fisher's retirement from Parliament to become the next High Commissioner to the United Kingdom. The ministry was replaced by the Second Hughes ministry on 14 November 1916 following the split that took place within Labor over the issue of conscription. This led to Hughes and his supporters leaving the party to form the National Labor Party.

King O'Malley, who died in 1953, was the last surviving member of the First Hughes ministry; O'Malley was also the last surviving member of the Second Fisher ministry.

Ministry

References

Ministries of George V
Hughes 1
1915 establishments in Australia
1916 disestablishments in Australia
Australian Labor Party ministries
Cabinets established in 1915
Cabinets disestablished in 1916